The Golden Bracelet is an American fairy tale from Kentucky, collected by Marie Campbell in Tales from the Cloud Walking Country, listing her informant as Aunt Lizbeth Fields.

It is Aarne-Thompson type 533.  Another tale of this type is The Goose Girl, although The Golden Bracelet differs in several respects, appearing to be derived from a Gaelic variant.

Plot summary

A dying queen, instead of making her husband promise not to remarry, made her daughter a bracelet of golden thread and her own golden hair.  The king remarried, to a woman with her own, ugly daughter.  The new queen took all the best things for her daughter and would not let the king's daughter go to parties.  The king's daughter took pleasure in her golden bracelet that she did not mind, but sat and sewed, and went for walks with her little dog.  One day, a strange man rode by and asked what she was doing.  As a joke, she said she was making a fine pocket handkerchief for the King of Spain.  He told her that he was the King of Spain and she could give it to him; she told him she had to finish it, and it would take a week.  After a week, he asked her to marry him; she told him she had to think, and her stepsister also thought about him.  The king sent for her, and the stepsister went with her, because it would be improper for her to go alone, and on the way, she stole the golden bracelet and made her promise never to tell a person.  Then she magically changed herself to beautiful and made the king's daughter ugly, though she could not change their characters.  The king did not love the stepsister, but felt bound by his word and married her.  The little dog had followed the king's daughter, and she told it her story.  The old king heard her and told the young king, who got rid of his bride and married the true bride.

References

American fairy tales
Fictional queens
ATU 500-559